Archaeology in Oceania  is a triannual peer-reviewed academic journal covering prehistoric and historic archaeology, especially concerning Australia, the islands of the Pacific Ocean, and the western Pacific Rim. The journal is published by Wiley-Blackwell on behalf of Oceania Publications. It was originally published by the University of Sydney. The editor-in-chief is J. Peter White. It is indexed in Anthropological Literature, Scopus, Arts and Humanities Citation Index, and Social Sciences Citation Index.

The journal is associated with Oceania, published by the same publisher and covering ethnographic research in the area.

External links 
 

Archaeology journals
Wiley-Blackwell academic journals
Triannual journals
Publications established in 1966
English-language journals